Meindert De Jong, sometimes spelled de Jong, DeJong or Dejong (4 March 1906 – 16 July 1991) was a Dutch-born American writer of children's books. He won the international Hans Christian Andersen Award in 1962 for his contributions as a children's writer.

Life

De Jong was born in the village of Wierum in the province of Friesland, Netherlands. (The correct Dutch and Frisian spelling of his surname is 'de Jong' when preceded by his first name or initials, and 'De Jong' when not.) The family emigrated to the United States in 1914. De Jong attended Dutch Calvinist secondary schools and Calvin College in Grand Rapids, Michigan, and entered the University of Chicago, but left without graduating.

De Jong held various jobs during the Great Depression and began writing children's books at the suggestion of a local librarian. His first book, The Big Goose and the Little White Duck, was published in 1938. He wrote several more books before joining the US Army Air Corps during World War II, serving in China.

After the war, De Jong resumed writing, and for several years resided in Mexico. He returned for a time to Michigan. After settling in North Carolina, he returned to Michigan for the final years of his life.

Six of De Jong's books were illustrated by Maurice Sendak.

Awards

In 1962 De Jong won the biennial, international Hans Christian Andersen Award for his lasting contribution to literature for young people. He was the first American recipient of the honor, the highest international recognition for a creator of children's books (later, for a writer or illustrator).

He was also recognized many times for particular works.
 Shadrach and Hurry Home, Candy were both runners-up for the Newbery Medal in 1954.
 The Wheel on the School won the U.S. Newbery Medal in 1955 and the second annual Deutscher Jugendliteraturpreis in 1957 (in its German translation, Das Rad auf der Schule, with new illustrations by Marianne Richter). It was named to the Lewis Carroll Shelf Award list in 1963.
 The House of Sixty Fathers received the Josette Frank Award (then named the Children's Book Award of the Child Study Association) in 1956. It was a Newbery runner-up in 1957.
 Along Came a Dog was a Newbery runner-up in 1959.
 Journey from Peppermint Street won the inaugural National Book Award in category Children's Books in 1969.

References

External links

 Meindert De Jong at Harper Collins
 

1906 births
1991 deaths
American children's writers
Jong, Meindert de
Hans Christian Andersen Award for Writing winners
National Book Award for Young People's Literature winners
Newbery Medal winners
Newbery Honor winners
Jong, Meindert de
Calvin University alumni
United States Army Air Forces soldiers
Place of death missing
20th-century novelists
United States Army Air Forces personnel of World War II